Joe Kiernan (22 October 1942 – August 2006) was a Scottish professional footballer who played 352 matches for Northampton Town. He played either on the left side of defence or midfield.

Career
In 1958, Kiernan joined Sunderland as an apprentice and made two appearances for the first team netting twice in a League cup game verses Oldham Athletic. He then joined Northampton Town in 1963 for £2,000. He was one of the leading players on the club's books when they went into Division One. He was on the verge of becoming a Scottish international however as the Cobblers were relegated down the divisions. During the 1966-67 season he underwent two cartilage operations. Kiernan made 42 appearances in Division One. He was released prematurely in 1972 and joined Kettering Town where he captained them under Ron Atkinson to the Championship of the Southern League Division One North. He later turned to coaching, firstly with Irthlingborough Diamonds and in 1986 he took over the running of the Cobblers youth team under Graham Carr. When Theo Foley was appointed manager in 1990, he made Kiernan his number two but the club drifted into administration and Kiernan returned to his trade as a painter and decorator. Kiernan stands at fifth in the list of Northampton's most league appearances with 308 games (352 from all appearances, with 14 goals) He died in August 2006.

External links
Northampton In Memoriam

1942 births
2006 deaths
Scottish footballers
Sunderland A.F.C. players
Northampton Town F.C. players
Kettering Town F.C. players
English Football League players
Association football wing halves